The following article presents a summary of the 2001 football (soccer) season in Brazil, which was the 100th season of competitive football in the country.

Campeonato Brasileiro Série A

Quarterfinals

Semifinals

Final

Atlético-PR declared as the Campeonato Brasileiro champions by aggregate score of 5-2.

Relegation
The four worst placed teams, which are Santa Cruz, América-MG Botafogo-SP and Sport, were relegated to the following year's second level.

Campeonato Brasileiro Série B

Paysandu declared as the Campeonato Brasileiro Série B champions.

Promotion
The two best placed teams in the final stage of the competition, which are Paysandu and Figueirense, were promoted to the following year's first level.

Relegation
The four clubs defeated in the relegation playoffs, which are ABC, Nacional-AM, Desportiva-ES and Serra, were relegated to the following year's third level.

Campeonato Brasileiro Série C

Etti Jundiaí declared as the Campeonato Brasileiro Série C champions.

Promotion
The two best placed teams in the final stage of the competition, which are Etti Jundiaí and Mogi Mirim, were promoted to the following year's second level.

Copa do Brasil

The Copa do Brasil final was played between Grêmio and Corinthians.

Grêmio declared as the cup champions by aggregate score of 5-3.

Copa dos Campeões

The Copa dos Campeões final was played between Flamengo and São Paulo.

Flamengo declared as the cup champions by aggregate score of 7-6.

Regional and state championship champions

Regional championship champions

State championship champions

Youth competition champions

Other competition champions

Brazilian clubs in international competitions

Brazil national team
The following table lists all the games played by the Brazil national football team in official competitions and friendly matches during 2001.

Women's football

Brazil women's national football team
The following table lists all the games played by the Brazil women's national football team in official competitions and friendly matches during 2001.

Domestic competition champions

References

 Brazilian competitions at RSSSF
 2001 Brazil national team matches at RSSSF
 2000-2003 Brazil women's national team matches at RSSSF

 
Seasons in Brazilian football
Brazil